The Teesdale Way is a long-distance walk between the Cumbrian Pennines and the North Sea coast of North Yorkshire in England.

The route

The Teesdale way starts at Dufton in Cumbria as part of the Pennine way, but does not become its own path (with waymarkers) until it reaches Middleton-in-Teesdale. The path ends at South Gare in Warrenby near Redcar, having passed through the heavily industrialised Teesside area, consisting of Middlesbrough, Stockton-on-Tees and Thornaby-on-Tees. This gives a great insight into the once proud ship building and industrial heritage of the North East. Between Middleton-in-Teesdale and Middlesbrough, the way runs for  jointly with the European E2 path.

Between Yarm and Croft-on-Tees the river goes through the meandering lowland section of the Tees Valley. As the river flows through Upper Teesdale, it passes through the historic settlements of Piercebridge and Barnard Castle.

The route can also be seen as starting at the county boundaries between Cumbria and County Durham near to Cow Green Reservoir. Also in Upper Teesdale the walk makes a U-turn at Eggleston Hall, heading down the other side of the dale, back to Barnard Castle.

Thornaby and Bassleton woods are connected to each other. They are located in Thornaby, in the Borough of Stockton-on-Tees. A  section of the way between Middlesbrough and Redcar was known locally as 'The Black Path' and was used by steelworkers.

At , Thornaby Woods is a large area of ancient woodland and features trees such as oak, elm and wych-elm. Roe deer have been seen in and around Thornaby and Bassleton woods.

Sights and attractions

Industrial Teesside
 Teesside Steel Works, Lackenby
 Riverside Stadium, Middlesbrough
 Middlesbrough Transporter Bridge

Tees Corridor
 Teessaurus Park
 Tees Newport Bridge
 A19 Tees Viaduct
 Tees Barrage and Teesside White Water Course
 Infinity Bridge
 Princess of Wales Bridge
 Teesquay Millennium Bridge
 Victoria Bridge

Nature reserves
Maze Park Nature Reserve, Middlesbrough
Black Bobbies Field Nature Reserve, Thornaby-on-Tees
Bowesfield Nature Reserve, Thornaby-on-Tees
Bassleton Wood, Thornaby-on-Tees
Gainford Spa Nature Reserve, Gainford

Waterfalls
High Cup Nick
Cauldron Snout
High Force
Low Force

Museums
 Great Holme Museum, Eaglescliffe
 Bowes Museum, Barnard Castle

Stately homes
Rokeby Park, Whorlton
Eggleston Hall

Ruins
Medieval village of Newsham
Sockburn Church Ruins
Castle Hill, Blackwell
Baydale Chapel Ruins
Gainforth Mill
Piercebridge Roman Fort
Piercebridge Roman Bridge
Mortham Tower, near Greta Bridge
Egglestone Abbey
Cotherstone Castle

Village churches
St John's Church, Low Dinsdale
All Saints Church, Girsby 
All Saints Church, Hurworth-on-Tees 
St Peter's Church, Croft-on-Tees
St Edwin's Church, Coniscliffe
St Mary's Church, Piercebridge
St Mary's Church, Gainford
St Andrew's Church, Winston
St Mary's Church, Whorton
St Romald's Church, Romaldkirk

Other 
 South Gare
 Butterfly World, Eaglescliffe
 Whorlton Lido
 Deepdale Aqueduct
 Octagonal Market Cross, Barnard Castle.

Settlements

Dufton
Middleton-in-Teesdale
Eggleston
Romaldkirk
Startforth
Barnard Castle
Whorlton
Winston
Gainford
Piercebridge
Carlbury
High Coniscliffe
Merrybent
Low Coniscliffe
Blackwell
Stapleton
Croft-on-Tees
Hurworth Place
Hurworth-on-Tees

Neasham
Sockburn
Girsby
Low Dinsdale
Over Dinsdale
Middleton St George
Middleton One Row
Low Worsall
Aislaby
Yarm
Eaglescliffe
Preston-on-Tees
Thornaby-on-Tees
Stockton-on-Tees
Middlesbrough
North Ormesby
Dormanstown
Warrenby

References

External links
The Durham Cow website - breaks the route down and has detailed maps
GPS walking and cycling webpage

Long-distance footpaths in England
Tourist attractions in County Durham
Footpaths in North Yorkshire
Geography of County Durham